The Minto Armoury is a prominent and historic structure in the West End of Winnipeg, Manitoba. The armoury is currently the home base of The Royal Winnipeg Rifles, The Queen's Own Cameron Highlanders of Canada, 38 Signal Regiment, and several other reserve units. The building remains an active military structure. It is noted for its smooth integration into the character of the neighbourhood and remains a local landmark, both factors have help to certify the Minto Armoury as a Recognized Federal Heritage Building.

Architecture
The armoury was designed by Chief Dominion Architect David Ewart, and was opened the next year and work on the structure was completed in 1915. The Minto Armoury is an example of Tudor Revival architecture designed by Fuller. It has Canada's standard fortress motif with square corner towers and the arched entrance. The distinctive red bricks that were part of the buildings design were originally produced by the Sidney Brickworks company, the company's bricks were also used on important sites such as the St. Edward’s Roman Catholic Church on Arlington Street in Winnipeg.

History
A fire destroyed the original wooden roof structure on January 22, 1956. Most of the  regimental trophies and records, musical instruments, kilts, and rifles were rescued from the fire as responders got to the scene. The roof was then replaced with its current steel truss structure that is in use today. 
The building was designated a National Historic Site of Canada in 1991.

See also
 List of Armouries in Canada

References

External links

Buildings and structures in Winnipeg
Armouries in Canada
National Historic Sites in Manitoba
Romanesque Revival architecture in Canada
Government buildings completed in 1915
Thomas Fuller buildings
Classified Federal Heritage Building
1915 establishments in Manitoba
West End, Winnipeg
Royal Winnipeg Rifles
Queen's Own Cameron Highlanders of Canada